Nickel Asia Corporation (NAC) is a Philippine mining company based at the Bonifacio Global City in Taguig, Metro Manila which primarily mines lateritic nickel ore.

Mining

Founded in 1969 by Manuel “Manny” B. Zamora Jr, brother of businessman Salvador “Buddy” B. Zamora and former San Juan City Congressman Ronaldo “Ronnie” B. Zamora of the Zamora family, it has 4 operational mining sites:
  Rio Tuba Nickel Mining Corporation (RTNMC, oldest, opened in 1969, shipped nickel internationally in 1975- Bataraza town, Palawan
  Taganito Mining Corporation - Claver, Surigao del Norte
 The Taganito HPAL Nickel Plant is situated on the coastline ~ 10 km to east of Claver at the Taganito river estuary.
  Hinatuan Mining Corporation - barangay Talavera, Hinatuan
  Cagdianao Mining Corporation - Cagdianao, Dinagat

The main products, saprolite and limonite ore, are used by NAC's Japanese, Chinese and Australian customers to produce ferronickel and nickel pig iron (NPI).

In 2015, sales of nickel ore rose 10% to 19.7 million wet metric tons (WMT) with a revenue of P15.4 billion.

NAC's sites were among those under critical inspection of the DENR (Department of Environment and Natural Resources), accused of a range of environmental law violations with uncontrolled siltation and soil erosion, dust emissions cited as the main reasons amongst others. The Hinatuan site was one of 20 mining sites subsequently proposed for close-down in September 2016.

Other ventures
Besides the mining business, NAC also has invested in renewable energy and power generation with Emerging Power Inc (established in 2001), (EPI), operating in Subic Bay Freeport, Nauhan, Mindoro Oriental, and Biliran. Jobin-SQM Inc operating in Subic.  NAC has also ventured into gold and copper exploration with subsidiaries, Cordillera Exploration Co Inc, and Newminco Pacific Mining Corp.The Zamora family has also ventured into the copper industry. MRC Allied Inc on March 11, 2022, sold 100% of their stakes in Tampakan Copper-Gold Project and Marihatag Copper-Gold Project in Tampakan, Davao Del Sur, and the Boston-Cateel Copper-Gold Project and Paquibato Copper-Gold Project in Davao Oriental and Davao Del Norte to Salvador “Buddy” Zamora.

The Zamora family also has interests in the following industries: Security Bank (Banking; purchased from Ronald Gapud in 1986), MANTA Equities Inc (Property holding firm established in 1990), Informatics Philippines (Part of the Informatics Group in Singapore; College established in 1993), St Luke’s Medical Center (Healthcare established in 1903), Zamora and Poblador law (Law firm established in 1993), and Cafe Lyon/Dome Cafe (Food and beverage; franchised in 1993) YUKI (Food and beverage; franchised 2019),and Pepper Lunch (Food and beverage; franchised in 2008).

See also
Nickel mining
Laterite

References

External links

Mining companies of the Philippines
Nickel mines in the Philippines
Companies based in Bonifacio Global City
Companies listed on the Philippine Stock Exchange